São Carlos is Portuguese for Saint Charles. It may also refer to:

Places
 São Carlos, the city of the state of São Paulo in Brazil.
 São Carlos Airport, the city of São Carlos airport.
 São Carlos, Santa Catarina, the city of the state of Santa Catarina in Brazil.

Theatres
Teatro Nacional de São Carlos, the main Lisbon opera theatre.
 Teatro Municipal de São Carlos, the main São Carlos theatre.

Sport
 São Carlos FC, a Brazilian football (soccer) team.
 São Carlos Clube, a club in the city of São Carlos, Brazil.